The 1954 Tennessee Volunteers (variously Tennessee, UT, or the Vols) represented the University of Tennessee in the 1954 college football season. Playing as a member of the Southeastern Conference (SEC), the team was led by head coach Harvey Robinson, in his second year, and played their home games at Shields–Watkins Field in Knoxville, Tennessee. They finished the season with a record of four wins and six losses (4–6 overall, 1–5 in the SEC).

Schedule

Roster
HB #45 Johnny Majors, So.

Team players drafted into the NFL

References

Tennessee
Tennessee Volunteers football seasons
Tennessee Volunteers football